Truly Human, certified as Dogme #18, is a 2001 Danish drama film written and directed by Åke Sandgren, and starring Nikolaj Lie Kaas, Peter Mygind, and . Produced by Lars von Trier's and Peter Aalbæk Jensen's company Zentropa, the film was created following the Dogme 95 rules, and is experimental in style and narrative.

Plot 
A contemporary fable about an invisible man who is given the chance to become a real human being. "P" is an imaginary character in the mind of seven-year-old Lisa. He lives behind the wallpaper in her bedroom. One day the house is demolished and he emerges from the rubble. With no language or identity he sets out into the human world, ending up at a refugee centre. This is the start of the account of "P's" dramatic progress through decline on his way to become truly human.

Cast 
 Nikolaj Lie Kaas as P
 Peter Mygind as Walther
  as Charlotte (as Susan A. Olsen)
  as Stromboli
  as Tanja
  as Kjeldsen
 Clara Nepper Winther as Lisa
  as Benny
  as Molly (as Chalotte Munksgaard)
 Klaus Bondam as Ulrik
 Peter Belli as Sedergren
  as customer in shoe shop
 Josephine Cadan as Zelma
 Jesper Asholt as Tern
 Henning Palner as Forsberg
  as Anna, secretary

Themes 
The film uses a Kaspar Hauser-like fantasy premise to tell a modern-day story that deal with sensitive issues like racism and immigration with a sharp edge to it.

Accolades 
Nikolaj Lie Kaas won the 2002 Robert Award for Best Actor in a Leading Role for his role as P.

References

External links 
 
 
 

2001 drama films
2001 films
Danish drama films
2000s Danish-language films
Films directed by Åke Sandgren
Films shot in Denmark
Zentropa films

Dogme 95 films